İstanbul Üniversitesi SK is a Turkish women's basketball club based in Istanbul, Turkey. The club plays in the Turkish Regional League (KBBL), the third level women's basketball league in Turkey. İstanbul Üniversitesi has a championship in the Turkish Super League, the highest basketball women's league in Turkey.

Honours
 Turkish Super League
 Winners (1): 1988-89

References

External links

Women's basketball teams in Turkey
Sport in Istanbul
Basketball teams established in 1953